Magnus Gregory (born 26 December 1998) is an English international canoeist.

Education
He was educated at Abingdon School from 2010-2017, where he was in the sailing first team and excelled at kayaking.

Career
He won the Junior U-18 Sprint Canoe European Championship and also won silver medals at both the Junior Sprint and Marathon World
Championships.

He received his first senior international call up and competed in the 2017 ICF Canoe Sprint World Championships – Men's K-1 5000 metres event at the 2017 ICF Canoe Sprint World Championships in Račice, Czech Republic.

See also
List of Old Abingdonians

References

1998 births
Living people
English male canoeists
British male canoeists
People educated at Abingdon School
Sportspeople from Oxford